Loaded is a half-hour-long series on the public TV station Fuse TV. During the show, videos from one specific artist play. Usually there is a mix of old and new videos for each artist.  Depending on the video length there are between 5 and 6 videos per episode.

List of artists featured
2 Chainz
311
50 Cent
The Academy Is...
Aerosmith
AFI
Against Me!
Akon
Alanis Morissette
All-American Rejects
Angels & Airwaves
Ariana Grande
ASAP Mob
Audioslave
Avenged Sevenfold
Avril Lavigne
Beastie Boys
Beck
Beyoncé
The Black Eyed Peas
Blink-182
Blur
Bright Eyes
Britney Spears
Bruno Mars
Bush
Chevelle
Christina Aguilera
Chris Brown
Ciara
Coheed and Cambria
Dashboard Confessional
Daughtry
Depeche Mode
Drake
Eminem
Evanescence
Fall Out Boy
Fat Joe
Fergie
Fifth Harmony
Flo Rida
Foo Fighters
Future
+French Montana
Good Charlotte
Gorillaz
Green Day
Guns N' Roses
Gwen Stefani
Iggy Azalea
Ja Rule
Janet Jackson
Jason Derulo
Jay-Z
Jennifer Hudson
Jennifer Lopez
Justin Bieber
Justin Timberlake
Kanye West
Katy Perry
Kelly Clarkson
Kendrick Lamar
Kid Rock
The Killers
Kings Of Leon
Korn
Lady Gaga
Lil' Kim
Lil Wayne
Limp Bizkit
Linkin Park
Macklemore
Madonna
Mariah Carey
Maroon 5
Metallica
Michael Jackson
Miley Cyrus
Missy Elliott
Muse
My Chemical Romance
Mýa
Nelly
Nelly Furtado
New Found Glory
Nickelback
Nicki Minaj
Nine Inch Nails
Nirvana
No Doubt
The Notorious B.I.G.
Oasis
The Offspring
One Direction
Outkast
Panic! at the Disco
Paramore
Pearl Jam
Pharrell Williams
Pink
Prince
Pussycat Dolls
R. Kelly
Radiohead
Red Hot Chili Peppers
Rick Ross
Rihanna
Rise Against
Run-D.M.C.
Sam Smith
Sean Combs
Seether
Slipknot
Soundgarden
Stone Temple Pilots
Sum 41
System of a Down
T.I.
Taking Back Sunday
Taylor Swift
Three Days Grace
Tupac Shakur
U2
The Used
Usher
Van Halen
Weezer
Whitney Houston
Wiz Khalifa
Wyclef Jean
Xzibit
Young Thug

Format
The show airs at 6:00 P.M. ET on all weekdays, 2:00 P.M. ET and 6:00 P.M. ET on Monday, 2:00 A.M. ET, 2:30 A.M. ET, 2:00 P.M. ET and 6:00 P.M. ET on Tuesday, and adds an episode for every weekday except Thursday, on which there are 6, Saturday night when there is 1 episode.  The same weekday schedule is employed on Saturday and Sunday.  An average episode would have 5-6 music videos from the same artist, depending on the length of each video. Recently, the network added a program where various artists' music videos are shown, this episode is called "Voodoo".

See also
The Sauce
Fuse TV
Voodoo

External links

Fuse (TV channel) original programming